Theophiliscus (died 205 BC) was the commander of the Rhodian quinquereme fleet at the Battle of Chios. The battle ended in a Rhodian and Pergamese victory but Theophiliscus died of wounds he received in the battle.

References

Polybius. The Rise of the Roman Empire. 
Polybius  The Histories - Book XVI

Ancient Rhodian admirals
3rd-century BC Greek people
205 BC deaths
Year of birth unknown